Kabisera is a 2016 Filipino sociopolitical drama film starring Nora Aunor and Ricky Davao. The film is directed by Arturo San Agustin and Real Florido, and was produced under Silver Story Entertainment and Fire Starters Productions.

The film was selected to be an official entry to the 2016 Metro Manila Film Festival.

Plot
A Filipino family deals with hooded people who are involved in extra-judicial killings and other abuses in Philippine society.

Cast

Nora Aunor  
Ricky Davao
JC de Vera
Jason Abalos
RJ Agustin
Victor Neri
Ronwaldo Martin
Ces Quesada
Perla Bautista
Menggie Cobarrubias
Alex San Agustin
Kiko Matos
Karl Medina
Edwin Reyes
Coleen Perez
Rhen Escaño

References

External links
 

Philippine drama films
Films directed by Arturo San Agustin